Pembroke Township may refer to:

Canada
 Pembroke Township, Ontario, now part of Laurentian Valley

Ireland
 Pembroke Township, now part of Dublin

United States
 Pembroke Township, Kankakee County, Illinois
 Pembroke Township, Robeson County, North Carolina, in Robeson County, North Carolina

Township name disambiguation pages